Rik de Voest and Ashley Fisher were the defending champions, but lost in the final 6–4, 7–6(7–3) to tournament winners Eric Butorac and Travis Parrott.

Seeds

Draw

Draw

References
 Main Draw (ATP)
 Qualifying Draw (ATP)

Odlum Brown Vancouver Open - Men's Doubles
Vancouver Open